Karel Novy (born 12 June 1980 as Karel Nový) is a Swiss freestyle swimmer who won three bronze medals at short-course (25 m pool) European Championships. He also competed in five freestyle events at the Summer Olympics of 2000, 2004 and 2008, but never reached the finals.

References

External links
nbcolympics 2008 profile

1980 births
Living people
Olympic swimmers of Switzerland
Swimmers at the 2000 Summer Olympics
Swimmers at the 2004 Summer Olympics
Swimmers at the 2008 Summer Olympics
Swiss male freestyle swimmers
Swiss people of Czech descent
People from Domažlice